Gözlü can refer to:

 Gözlü, Ergani
 Gözlü, Hazro